Sri Bhadravarman was a ruler of the medieval kingdom of Pahang who reigned in the middle of the 4th century CE. His name was described in the Book of Song as She-li- Po-luo-ba-mo, the king of Pohuang or Panhuang (婆皇), who sent an envoy to the Liu Song court in 449-450 with forty one types of products.  In 456-457, another envoy of the same country, led by a Senapati, arrived at the Chinese capital, Jiankang with tributes.

References 

Sultans of Pahang
Founding monarchs
5th-century monarchs in Asia